Anne Perry (born Juliet Marion Hulme; 28 October 1938) was convicted of murder in New Zealand when a teenager, later moved to England and became an author. In 1954, at the age of fifteen, she and her 16-year-old friend Pauline Parker were tried and found guilty of the murder of Parker's mother, Honorah Rieper. She changed her name after serving a five-year sentence for Rieper's murder. 

Perry is perhaps now best known as the author of the Thomas Pitt and William Monk series of historical detective fiction.

Early life
Born in Blackheath, London, the daughter of physicist Henry Rainsford Hulme, Perry was diagnosed with tuberculosis as a child and sent to the Caribbean, South Africa, and New Zealand in hopes that a warmer climate would improve her health. A 1948 Auckland Star photograph of Juliet arriving in New Zealand was discovered by Auckland Libraries staff and written about in the Heritage et AL blog. She rejoined her family around her tenth birthday after her father took a position as Rector of Canterbury University College in New Zealand. She attended Christchurch Girls' High School, located in what became the Cranmer Centre.

Murder and trial

In June 1954, at the age of 15, Hulme and her best friend Pauline Parker murdered Parker's mother, Honorah Rieper. Hulme's parents were in the process of separating and she was supposed to go to South Africa to stay with a relative. The two teenage friends, who had created a complicated fantasy life together populated with famous actors such as James Mason and Orson Welles, did not want to be separated.

On 22 June 1954, the girls and Honorah Rieper went for a walk in Victoria Park in their hometown of Christchurch. On an isolated path Hulme dropped an ornamental stone so that Rieper would lean over to retrieve it. Parker had planned to hit her mother with half a brick wrapped in a stocking. The girls presumed that one blow would kill her but it took more than 20.

Parker and Hulme stood trial in Christchurch in 1954 and were found guilty on 29 August. As they were too young to be considered for the death penalty under New Zealand law at the time, they were convicted and sentenced to be "detained at Her Majesty's pleasure". They were released separately five years later.

Parker and Hulme are not believed to have had any contact since the trial.

The events formed the basis for the 1994 film Heavenly Creatures, in which Melanie Lynskey portrayed a teenage Pauline Parker and Kate Winslet the teenaged Juliet Hulme.  At the time of the film's release, it was not generally known that mystery author "Anne Perry" was Juliet Hulme, whose identity was made public some months after the film's release. Although some presumed Hulme and Parker's relationship to be sexual, Perry stated in 2006 that, while the relationship was obsessive, the two "were never lesbians".

Later life
After being released from prison in November 1959, Hulme returned to England and became a flight attendant. For a period she lived in the United States, where she joined the Church of Jesus Christ of Latter-day Saints in 1968. She later settled in the Scottish village of Portmahomack where she lived with her mother. Her father had a distinguished scientific career, heading the British hydrogen bomb programme.

Hulme took the name Anne Perry, using her stepfather's surname. Her first novel, The Cater Street Hangman, was published under this name in 1979. Her works generally fall into one of several categories of genre fiction, including historical murder mysteries and detective fiction. Many feature recurring characters, most importantly Thomas Pitt, who appeared in her first novel, and amnesiac private investigator William Monk, who first appeared in her 1990 novel The Face of a Stranger. By 2003 she had published 47 novels, and several collections of short stories.  Her story "Heroes", which first appeared in the 1999 anthology Murder and Obsession, edited by Otto Penzler, won the 2001 Edgar Award for Best Short Story.

In 2005, Perry appeared on the Trisha show to discuss the crime on a special themed show. A 2009 documentary film, Anne Perry Interiors, gave a snapshot of her life and the people close to her.

In 2017, Perry left Scotland and moved to Hollywood in order to more effectively promote films based on her novels.

Bibliography
Each series is listed in internal chronological order, according to the author's website.

The two main series each feature a male and a female protagonist. Thomas Pitt is matched with Charlotte; her female society relatives help in the mysteries out of boredom. William Monk is matched with Hester Latterly, a Crimean War nurse. The Monk mysteries are set earlier in the Victorian era (1850s–1860s) than the Pitt books (1880s–1890s). Hester plays a very strong role in these stories; in some cases she is a better investigator than Monk. The Christmas stories involve minor characters such as sisters, bosses, or grandmothers in a personal crisis at a later Christmas time with a strongly enforced redemption message at the end.

Featuring Thomas Pitt

 The Cater Street Hangman (1979)
 Callander Square (1980)
 Paragon Walk (1981)
 Resurrection Row (1981)
 Rutland Place (1983)
 Bluegate Fields (1984)
 Death in the Devil's Acre (1985)
 Cardington Crescent (1987)
 Silence in Hanover Close (1988)
 Bethlehem Road (1990)
 Highgate Rise (1991)
 Belgrave Square (1992)
 Farrier's Lane (1993)
 The Hyde Park Headsman (1994)
 Traitors Gate (1995)
 Pentecost Alley (1996)
 Ashworth Hall (1997)
 Brunswick Gardens (1998)
 Bedford Square (1999)
 Half Moon Street (2000)
 The Whitechapel Conspiracy (2001)
 Southampton Row (2002)
 Seven Dials (2003)
 Long Spoon Lane (2005)
 Buckingham Palace Gardens (2008)
 Betrayal at Lisson Grove (US title: Treason at Lisson Grove) (2011)
 Dorchester Terrace (2012)
 Midnight at Marble Arch (2013)
 Death on Blackheath (2014)
 The Angel Court Affair (2015)
 Treachery at Lancaster Gate (2016)
 Murder on the Serpentine (2016)

Featuring Daniel Pitt
 Twenty-One Days (2018)
 Triple Jeopardy (2019)
 One Fatal Flaw (2020)
 Death with a Double Edge (2021)
 Three Debts Paid (2022)

Featuring William Monk

 The Face of a Stranger (1990)
 A Dangerous Mourning (1991)
 Defend and Betray (1992)
 A Sudden, Fearful Death (1993)
 The Sins of the Wolf (1994)
 Cain His Brother (1995)
 Weighed in the Balance (1996)
 The Silent Cry (1997)
 A Breach of Promise (alt. title: Whited Sepulchres) (1997)
 The Twisted Root (1999)
 Slaves of Obsession (alt. title: Slaves and Obsession) (2000)
 A Funeral in Blue (2001)
 Death of a Stranger (2002)
 The Shifting Tide (2004)
 Dark Assassin (2006)
 Execution Dock (2009)
 Acceptable Loss (2011)
 A Sunless Sea (2012)
 Blind Justice (2013)
 Blood on the Water (2014)
 Corridors of the Night (2015)
 Revenge in a Cold River (2016)
 An Echo of Murder (2017)
 Dark Tide Rising (2018)

Featuring Elena Standish
 Death in Focus (2019)
 A Question of Betrayal (2020)
 A Darker Reality (2021)

The World War I series
 No Graves As Yet (2003)
 Shoulder the Sky (2004)
 Angels in the Gloom (2005)
 At Some Disputed Barricade (2006)
 We Shall Not Sleep (2007)

The Christmas stories
 A Christmas Journey (2003)
 A Christmas Visitor (2004)
 A Christmas Guest (2005)
 A Christmas Secret (2006)
 A Christmas Beginning (2007)
 A Christmas Grace (2008)
 A Christmas Promise (2009)
 A Christmas Odyssey (2010)
 A Christmas Homecoming (2011)
 A Christmas Garland (2012)
 A Christmas Hope (2013)
 A New York Christmas (2014)
 A Christmas Escape (2015)
 A Christmas Message (2016)
 A Christmas Return (2017)
 A Christmas Revelation (2018)
 A Christmas Gathering (2019)
 A Christmas Resolution (2020)
 A Christmas Legacy (2021)
 A Christmas Deliverance (2022)

The Christmas Collections
 An Anne Perry Christmas: Two Holiday Novels (2006) – contains A Christmas Journey (2003) and A Christmas Visitor (2004)
 Anne Perry's Christmas Mysteries: Two Holiday Novels (2008) – contains A Christmas Guest (2005) and A Christmas Secret (2006)
 Anne Perry's Silent Nights: Two Victorian Christmas Mysteries (2009) – contains A Christmas Beginning (2007) and A Christmas Grace (2008)
 Anne Perry's Christmas Vigil: Two Victorian Holiday Mysteries (2011) – contains A Christmas Promise (2009) and A Christmas Odyssey (2010)
 Anne Perry's Christmas Crimes: Two Victorian Holiday Mysteries (2014) – contains A Christmas Homecoming (2011) and A Christmas Garland (2012)
 Anne Perry's Merry Mysteries: Two Victorian Holiday Novels (2015) – contains A Christmas Hope (2013) and A New York Christmas (2014)

Fantasy
 Tathea (1999)
 Come Armageddon (2001)

Timepiece series (young adult novels)
 Tudor Rose (2011)
 Rose of No Man's Land (2011)
 Blood Red Rose (2012)
 Rose Between Two Thorns (2012)

Other books
 The One Thing More (2000)
 A Dish Taken Cold (2001)
 Death by Horoscope (2001, short stories by various authors)
 Much Ado About Murder (2002, short stories by various authors)
 Death By Dickens (2004, short stories by various authors)
 I'd Kill For That (2004, one novel written by multiple authors)
 Letters From The Highlands (2004)
 Thou Shalt Not Kill: Biblical Mystery Stories (2005, short stories by various authors)
 Heroes (Most Wanted) (2007)
 The Sheen on the Silk: A Novel (2010)
 The Scroll (Short Story) (2013)

Critical studies, reviews and biography
The Search for Anne Perry, by Prof. Joanne Drayton.
Peter Graham's biography So Brilliantly Clever: Parker, Hulme and the Murder that Shocked the World (Wellington, NZ: Awa, 2011) has been re-issued in 2013 by Skyhorse as Anne Perry and the Murder of the Century.

See also

LDS fiction

References

External links

 
 
 Original Newspaper articles of the trial
 Crimelibrary.com story on the Parker-Hulme Murder
 Fantastic Fiction's Anne Perry page

 Anne Perry Interview with WritersNewsWeekly.com
 Interview with Anne Perry, A DISCUSSION WITH National Authors on Tour TV Series, Episode #76 (1994)
Interview with Anne Perry, Speaking of Mysteries TV Series (2001)

1938 births
Living people
20th-century English criminals
20th-century English writers
21st-century English writers
English fantasy writers
English mystery writers
Edgar Award winners
Converts to Mormonism
Agatha Award winners
Minors convicted of murder
English Latter Day Saints
New Zealand Latter Day Saints
British female murderers
New Zealand female murderers
English people convicted of murder
English people imprisoned abroad
People convicted of murder by New Zealand
People from Blackheath, London
People from Christchurch
Women mystery writers
Writers of historical mysteries
British women short story writers
New Zealand women short story writers
People educated at Christchurch Girls' High School
Women science fiction and fantasy writers
English women novelists
Women historical novelists
20th-century New Zealand writers
21st-century New Zealand writers
New Zealand fantasy writers
New Zealand mystery writers
New Zealand crime fiction writers
English crime fiction writers
Literature controversies
20th-century pseudonymous writers
21st-century pseudonymous writers
Pseudonymous women writers